Gaius Julius Hyginus ( 64 BC–17 AD) was a Roman poet, the author of Fabulae, and the reputed author of Poeticon astronomicon.

Hyginus may also refer to:

People
Hyginus Gromaticus ( 98–117), Roman surveyor
Pope Hyginus (died  142), Greek saint and bishop of Rome
Hyginus of Córdoba, 4th-century bishop and opponent of Priscillian

Other
Hyginus, a crater on the moon

See also
Pseudo-Hyginus (disambiguation)